Ludwig Damminger (29 October 1913 – 6 February 1981) was a German international footballer.

In two of his three internationals for the German national team, he scored two goals and also found the net in the other one.

References

External links
 
 
 

1913 births
1981 deaths
Association football forwards
German footballers
Germany international footballers